Nex Machina is a shoot 'em up video game developed and published by Housemarque. The game was released in June 2017 for the PlayStation 4 and Windows-based personal computers. Tentatively known as The Jarvis Project during development, veteran arcade game designer Eugene Jarvis served as a creative consultant on the project.

Gameplay

Nex Machina is a twin-stick shoot 'em up video game played from a top-down perspective. Players move through rooms shooting waves of enemies while attempting to save humans. Power-ups and weapon upgrades are dispersed throughout levels.

Development

Nex Machina was developed by Finnish video game studio Housemarque with designer Eugene Jarvis serving as a creative consultant.  Jarvis is known for his role in designing arcade shoot 'em ups such as Defender (1981), Robotron: 2084 (1982), and Smash TV (1990). At the 2014 D.I.C.E. Awards, Housemarque's founders Ilari Kuittinen and Harri Tikkanen met with Jarvis and asked him if he would be interested in collaborating on a game. Jarvis' games, particularly Defender, was a source of inspiration for Housemarque's 2013 game Resogun. For the design of Nex Machina, they combined elements from Jarvis' previous shoot 'em ups and Resogun. The development team experimented with different setups for the game's firing mechanics. They followed a different design philosophy than their 2016 game Alienation by choosing not to incorporate character progression systems in Nex Machina.

Nex Machina is powered by a significantly enhanced version of the game engine and voxel technology that was used for Resogun. The inclusion of a volumetric rendering technique known as Signed Distance Fields allows for a smooth transition between complex 3D meshes and voxel particles to give them more flexibility in how objects appear on the screen. The studio dubbed their art style for the game as cablepunk—a darker take on cyberpunk.

Release
Nex Machina was unveiled at the PlayStation Experience in December 2016. Housemarque signed a deal with Sony Interactive Entertainment to bring the game to the PlayStation 4 video game console. In March 2017, Housemarque announced that the game will also be released on Windows-based personal computers. Nex Machina was released on 20 June 2017; it is Housemarque's first self-published game. Housemarque is also considering creating a Nex Machina arcade cabinet with Jarvis' company Raw Thrills.

Reception

The game received generally positive reviews from critics. Metacritic calculated an average score of 88 out of 100 for the PlayStation 4 version based on 45 reviews and 84 out of 100 for the Windows version based on 16 reviews.

Eurogamer ranked the game eighth on their list of the "Top 50 Games of 2017".

Accolades
The game was nominated for "PlayStation Game of the Year" at the Golden Joystick Awards, for "Best PC Game" in Destructoids Game of the Year Awards 2017, and for "Best Action Game" in IGN's Best of 2017 Awards. It won the award for "Best Indie Action Game" in Game Informers 2017 Action Game of the Year Awards. It won "Big Screen Game of the Year 2017" and "Finnish Game of the Year 2017" in the Finnish Game Awards 2018, and was also nominated for "Visual Design" and "Music Design" at the 2018 Develop Awards.

References

External links
 

2017 video games
Housemarque games
PlayStation 4 games
Multidirectional shooters
Video games developed in Finland
Video games scored by Ari Pulkkinen
Windows games
PlayStation 4 Pro enhanced games
Multiplayer and single-player video games
Dystopian video games